The 2022 Minnesota's 1st congressional district special election was a special election held on August 9, 2022. The seat became vacant when incumbent Republican representative Jim Hagedorn died on February 17, 2022, from kidney cancer.

A primary was held on May 24, 2022, with the special election being held eleven weeks later, on August 9, alongside state primaries for other races. The special election was won by Republican Brad Finstad by a margin of 3.9%.

Republican primary

Candidates

Nominee 
Brad Finstad, former Minnesota Director of USDA Rural Development and former state representative

Eliminated in primary 

Matt Benda, agricultural law attorney
Jennifer Carnahan, former chair of the Republican Party of Minnesota and Hagedorn's widow
Bob Carney Jr., perennial candidate
J. R. Ewing, general manager of a biofuels plant
 Kevin Kocina, U.S. Marine Corps veteran
Jeremy Munson, state representative
Nels Pierson, state representative 
Roger Ungemach, engineer and business analyst

Withdrawn
Ken Navitsky, sales executive and former Minnesota State University placekicker (running for state senate)

Declined 
Jason Baskin, Austin city councilor
Carla Nelson, state senator (running for re-election, endorsed Pierson)
Julie Rosen, state senator (endorsed Finstad)

Endorsements

Polling

Results

Democratic–Farmer–Labor primary

Candidates

Nominee 
Jeff Ettinger, American corporate executive and former CEO of Hormel Foods

Eliminated in primary 

Warren Lee Anderson, retiree of retail
Sarah Brakebill-Hacke, MPhil candidate at Cambridge University and former business owner in direct voter contact
Candice Deal-Bartell, founder of Cultivate Mankato, founding board member of CultivateMN, and early childhood education advocate
Richard DeVoe, Red Wing bookseller
George H. Kalberer, CEO and president of Kalberer Financial Management and candidate for U.S. Senate in 2018 (Washington)
Richard Painter, University of Minnesota Law School professor, former White House ethics lawyer under President George W. Bush, and candidate for U.S. Senate in 2018
James Rainwater, attorney-mediator and arbitrator

Declined 
Dan Feehan, U.S. Army veteran, former U.S. Department of Defense official, nominee for this district in 2018 and 2020

Endorsements

Results

Legal Marijuana Now primary

Candidate

Nominee 
Richard B. Reisdorf, veteran

Results

Grassroots—Legalize Cannabis primary

Candidates

Nominee 
 Haroun McClellan, attorney and contracts manager

Results

General election

Predictions

Endorsements

Polling

Results

Notes

Partisan clients

References

External links
Official campaign websites
Jeff Ettinger (DFL) for Congress
Brad Finstad (R) for Congress

Minnesota 01 special
United States House of Representatives 01 special
United States House of Representatives 2022 01
Minnesota 2022 01
Minnesota 2022 01
2022 01 special